Gloria Tristani (born December 20, 1953) is an American attorney and politician. Tristani served as a member of the Federal Communications Commission (FCC) from 1997 to 2001. In 2002, Tristiani unsuccessfully ran for Senate in New Mexico as a Democrat, losing to Republican incumbent Pete Domenici.

Early life and education 
Of Mexican, Cuban, and Puerto Rican descent, Tristani was born and raised in San Juan, Puerto Rico. She is the granddaughter of Dennis Chávez, who served as a member of the United States House of Representatives and United States Senate. Her great-uncle, David Chávez, served as a judge and the 34th mayor of Santa Fe.

Tristani earned a Bachelor of Arts degree from Barnard College and a Juris Doctor at the University of New Mexico School of Law.

Early career
Tristani worked as an attorney in Albuquerque and is admitted to the bar in New Mexico and Colorado. In 1994, she was elected to New Mexico's State Corporation Commission (SCC) and served as its chair until 1996.  

While on New Mexico's SCC, she advocated on behalf of consumers rights regarding health insurance and telecommunications, helping draft rules regulating managed care and HMOs and helping draft the New Mexico Mothers and Newly Born Children Rule.

Federal Communications Commission (FCC) 
In 1997, she was appointed by President Bill Clinton to the Federal Communications Commission on September 15, 1997. While serving on the FCC, she pushed for broadband deployment to remote areas, served as the chair of the FCC's V-Chip Task Force, fought children's exposure to violence and indecency and supported the so-called E-rate for libraries and schools.

Post-FCC career 
Tristani resigned on September 7, 2001 to run as the Democratic candidate for the 2002 United States Senate election in New Mexico. Tristani was defeated by incumbent Republican Pete Domenici, and subsequently returned to private practice. 

Tristani was mentioned as a possible candidate in the 2006 Senate election in the event of a retirement by Democrat Jeff Bingaman, but Bingaman ultimately ran for reelection.

She later worked as of counsel to Spiegel & McDiarmid LLP, a law firm based in Washington, D.C. From 2017 to 2019, Tristani was a senior policy advisor to the National Hispanic Media Coalition.

Personal life and recognition 
She is married to Judge Gerard W. Thomson and has two children. In 2000, the National Association of Latino Elected Officials (NALEO) awarded her the Edward R. Roybal Award for Outstanding Public Service and was selected as Hispanic Business magazine's as one of the nation's 100 most influential Hispanics for the years 1996 and 1998.

Sources

External links

1953 births
20th-century American lawyers
20th-century American politicians
20th-century American women politicians
21st-century American politicians
21st-century American women politicians
American politicians of Puerto Rican descent
Barnard College alumni
Living people
Hispanic and Latino American women in politics
Members of the Federal Communications Commission
New Mexico Democrats
New Mexico lawyers
People from San Juan, Puerto Rico
Women in New Mexico politics
American politicians of Mexican descent
Clinton administration personnel
George W. Bush administration personnel
American politicians of Cuban descent